PSD-95 (postsynaptic density protein 95) also known as SAP-90 (synapse-associated protein 90) is a protein that in humans is encoded by the DLG4 (discs large homolog 4) gene.

PSD-95 is a member of the membrane-associated guanylate kinase (MAGUK) family. With PSD-93 it is recruited into the same NMDA receptor and potassium channel clusters. These two MAGUK proteins may interact at postsynaptic sites to form a multimeric scaffold for the clustering of receptors, ion channels, and associated signaling proteins. 
PSD-95 is the best studied member of the MAGUK-family of PDZ domain-containing proteins.  Like all MAGUK-family proteins, its basic structure includes three PDZ domains, an SH3 domain, and a guanylate kinase-like domain (GK) connected by disordered linker regions.  It is almost exclusively located in the post synaptic density of neurons, and is involved in anchoring synaptic proteins.  Its direct and indirect binding partners include neuroligin, NMDA receptors, AMPA receptors, and potassium channels. It plays an important role in synaptic plasticity and the stabilization of synaptic changes during long-term potentiation.

MAGUK superfamily and constituent domains
PSD-95 (encoded by DLG4) is a member of the MAGUK superfamily, and part of a subfamily which also includes PSD-93, SAP97 and SAP102. The MAGUKs are defined by their inclusion of PDZ, SH3 and GUK domains, although many of them also contain regions homologous of CaMKII, WW and L27 domains. The GUK domain that they have is structurally very similar to that of the guanylate kinases, however it is known to be catalytically inactive as the P-Loop which binds ATP is absent. It is thought that the MAGUKs have subfunctionalized the GUK domain for their own purposes, primarily based on its ability to form protein-protein interactions with cytoskeleton proteins, microtubule/actin based machinery and molecules involved in signal transduction.

The PDZ domain which are contained in the MAGUKs in varying numbers, is replicated three times over in PSD-95. PDZ domains are short peptide binding sequences commonly found at the C-terminus of interacting proteins. The three copies within the gene have different binding partners, due to amino acid substitutions within the PSD-95 protein and its ligands. The SH3 domain is again a protein-protein interaction domain. Its family generally bind to PXXP sites, but in MAGUKs it is known to bind to other sites as well. One of the most well known features is that it can form an intramolecular bond with the GUK domain, creating what is known as a GUK-SH3 'closed' state. The regulatory mechanisms and function are unknown but it is hypothesized that it may involve a hook region and a calmodulin binding region located elsewhere in the gene.

Model organisms

Model organisms have been used in the study of DLG4 function. A knockout mouse line, called Dlg4tm1Grnt was generated. Male and female animals underwent a standardized phenotypic screen to determine the effects of deletion. 
Twenty five tests were carried out on mutant mice and seven significant abnormalities were observed. Homozygous mutant animals had decreased body weight, atypical indirect calorimetry and DEXA data and a skin phenotype. Males also had abnormal plasma chemistry while females had abnormal haematology (a decreased mean corpuscular haemoglobin count).

Interactions
PSD-95 has been shown to interact with:

 ADAM22
 Beta-1 adrenergic receptor
 CACNG2
 CASK
 DLG3
 DLGAP1
 DLGAP2
 DYNLL1
 DYNLL2
 ERBB4
 EXOC4
 FYN
 FZD7
 GRIK1
 GRIK2
 GRIK5
 GRIN2A
 GRIN2B
 GRIN2C
 HER2/neu
 HGS
 KCNA2
 KCNA4
 KCNA5
 KCNJ12
 Kir2.1
 LGI1
 LRP1
 LRP2
 NLGN1
 NOS1
 PTK2B
 SEMA4C and
 SHANK2.

See also
Postsynaptic density

References

External links
 

Genes mutated in mice